Long Live is the sixth studio album by American metalcore band Atreyu. The album was released on September 18, 2015 through Spinefarm Records. It is Atreyu's first album since Congregation of the Damned in 2009. Long Live peaked at No. 26 on the Billboard 200, making it Atreyu's first album since The Curse to miss the top 20 of the chart.

Track listing

Personnel
Atreyu
 Alex Varkatzas – lead vocals
 Dan Jacobs – lead guitar
 Travis Miguel – rhythm guitar
 Porter McKnight – bass guitar
 Brandon Saller – drums, clean vocals

Technical personnel
 Fred Archambault – producer, engineer, mixing, additional programming
 Atreyu – co-producer
 Howie Weinberg – mastering
 Adal Wiley – additional programming
 Stephen Ferrera-Grand – guitar tech and rentals
 Mike Fasano – drum tech and rentals
 Matt Pauling – drum editing and programming
 Geoff Neal – assistant engineer, additional engineering
 Porter McKnight – design, photography, art direction

Charts

References

2015 albums
Atreyu (band) albums
Spinefarm Records albums